Zheng Saisai or Zheng Sai-Sai (born February 5, 1994) is a Chinese inactive tennis player. On 2 March 2020, she achieved her career-high singles ranking of world No. 34. On 11 July 2016, she peaked at No. 15 in the doubles rankings. In her career, she won one WTA Tour singles title, at the Premier 2019 Silicon Valley Classic), and five WTA doubles titles. She also reached the final of the 2019 French Open in doubles with compatriot Duan Yingying, and won three singles and three doubles titles on WTA 125 tournaments, as well as twelve singles and nine doubles titles on the ITF Women's Circuit.

Playing for China Fed Cup team, Zheng has a win–loss record of 11–6.

Early life and background
Zheng started playing tennis at age eight at tennis academy where mother worked. She stated that her tennis idol growing up was Justine Henin. Her favorite tournaments are Australian Open and Wimbledon. Zheng is coached by Alan Ma. Her favorite shot is drop shot.

Her father is of Tibetan ethnicity. She also has a Tibetan name, Suodian Zhuoma.

Her nickname is Jaguar, for her footwork and defence.

Professional career

2008–12: ITF & WTA debut, top 100 in doubles

Zheng began playing on the ITF Women's Circuit in June 2008, at the age of 14, where, at the $25k Qian Shan, she lost in the first round of qualifying against fellow Chinese Zhou Xiao. Her first main-draw appearance happened next year, at a $10k event in Jiangmen in February. In July 2009, she played her first ITF singles final and also win the trophy, at the $10k Shenzhen, after defeating Sabina Sharipova in the final. On the same tournament, she also made her doubles debut, but lost in the first round. In July 2010, she won her first ITF doubles title at the $10k Hefei, alongside Tian Ran. She won one singles title, at the $10k Taipei in October 2010.

In September 2011, Zheng made her WTA Tour debut in both singles and doubles at the Guangzhou International Open. There she won her first doubles title, partnering Hsieh Su-wei and defeating Chan Chin-wei and Han Xinyun in straight sets. In singles, she lost in the first round. Week later, she debut at the Premier Mandatory-level China Open as a wildcard player only in singles, but lost in the first round. During the year, she also did well at the ITF Circuit in doubles, winning the $100k Ningbo Challenger alongside Tetiana Luzhanska in September 2011, right before she made her WTA Tour debut. As the year passed by, Zheng progressed more and more in doubles ranking, starting the year as No. 794 and finishing the year as world No. 108. In singles, she rose from 670 to No. 276.

At the 2012 French Open, Zheng made her doubles Grand Slam debut and also won her first match there. Later, she had her first attempts to be part of the Grand Slam main draw in singles, but lost in the qualifications of Wimbledon, and later of US Open. In July 2012, she won her first singles match at the Premier-level Stanford Classic, defeating Ayumi Morita in the first round. For the second year-in-a-row, she played at the China Open as wildcard player, but again lost in the first round. This time she also played in doubles, but lost in the first round. During the season, she progress in singles ranking, entering top 150 for the first time in September 2012 and finished year as world No. 133. In doubles, she debuted in the top 100 in February 2012, then rose to No. 84 in July, but finished the year as world No. 98.

2013–15: Progress, Australian Open SF in doubles

Zheng had a strong start of the year, reaching Australian Open doubles semifinal as her first significant Grand Slam result. In that semifinal match, she partnered with Varvara Lepchenko and they were defeated by Australians Ashleigh Barty and Casey Dellacqua, in straight sets. She still do not shine in singles, but continued with good performances in doubles, reaching later quarterfinal at the French Open, also with Lepchenko, where they were defeated by top-seeded Italian duo Sara Errani and Roberta Vinci, in straight sets. In August, she made huge progress in singles, reaching the final of the Suzhou Open, but lost to Shahar Peer. By the end of the year, in singles, she reached two WTA 125 quarterfinals, in Nanjing and Taipei, while at both those tournaments she reached semifinals in doubles. She also reached semifinal of the International-level Japan Women's Open in doubles. In the doubles ranking, Zheng debut in the top 50 in doubles, getting to place 49 in March, and then rose to No. 38, that also was her year-end ranking. In singles, she made ups and downs in the rankings, but spent whole year inside top 200. She finished the year as world No. 162.

Things became better for Zheng in singles in 2014. She had her major main-draw debut in singles, passed qualifying at the US Open and also then her first match-win there. She defeated Stefanie Vögele in the first round, but then lost to Lucie Šafářová. She then had success at both WTA Tour and WTA 125 tournaments. At the WTA Tour, she first reached quarterfinal of the Hong Kong Open and then semifinal of the Tianjin Open, while at the Challenger Tour, she reached quarterfinals in Suzhou, Ningbo and Taipei. During the year, she reached one final in doubles, at the Malaysian Open in April. On 13 October 2014, she entered top 100 in singles, when she reached the spot of world No. 92. Zheng finished 2014 season as the 97th. In doubles, she made ups and downs, but spent whole year inside top 100 and finished 81.

During the year, Zheng made good performances, both in singles and doubles. Her most valued title of the year was at the Premier-level Stanford Classic in doubles event in August. That was her first final and title from higher-level tournament, than International. Along with that, in October she won Tianjin Open, also in doubles. In singles, her most recognized result of the year was in the first week of the year, at the Shenzhen Open, where she reached semifinal. In the second half of the year, she reached two quarterfinals, at the Japan Open and Guangzhou Open. On the WTA Challenger Tour, she reached final of the Dalian Open in singles, while in doubles she won the title, and so she did at the Jiangxi Open. On the ITF Circuit, she won two $75k titles in singles and one in doubles. At the end of the year, she was handed a wildcard for the WTA Elite Trophy in singles. However, she lost both matches in the round-robin group, to Madison Keys and Venus Williams.

2016–18: Top 25 in doubles & top 50 in singles year-end rankings

2019–21: First WTA title & career-high ranking, French Open doubles final, Olympics
At the 2019 French Open, Zheng made her first Grand Slam final, alongside Duan Yingying; they lost against Tímea Babos and Kristina Mladenovic, in straight sets. 

In August, Zheng won her first WTA tournament singles title at the 2019 Stanford Classic when she defeated the second-seeded Aryna Sabalenka in the final.

She reached a career-high singles ranking of world No. 34 on 2 March 2020, following a second quarterfinal showing at the Qatar Open.

Performance timelines

Only main-draw results in WTA Tour, Grand Slam tournaments, Fed Cup/Billie Jean King Cup and Olympic Games are included in win–loss records.

Singles

Doubles

Grand Slam tournament finals

Doubles: 1 (runner-up)

WTA career finals

Singles: 2 (1 title, 1 runner-up)

Doubles: 13 (5 titles, 8 runner-ups)

WTA 125 tournament finals

Singles: 5 (3 titles, 2 runner-ups)

Doubles: 3 (3 titles)

ITF Circuit finals

Singles: 20 (12 titles, 8 runner–ups)

Doubles: 16 (9 titles, 7 runner–ups)

Summer Youth Olympic Games

Singles: 1 (silver medal)

Doubles: 1 (gold medal)

Record against other players

Record against top 10 players
Zheng's record against players who have been ranked in the top 10. Active players are in boldface.

Wins over top-10 players

Notes

References

External links

 
 
 

1994 births
Living people
Chinese female tennis players
Tennis players from Shaanxi
Tennis players at the 2010 Summer Youth Olympics
Tennis players at the 2014 Asian Games
Asian Games medalists in tennis
Tibetan people
Asian Games silver medalists for China
Olympic tennis players of China
Tennis players at the 2016 Summer Olympics
Medalists at the 2014 Asian Games
Youth Olympic gold medalists for China
Sportspeople from Xi'an
Tennis players at the 2020 Summer Olympics